The 12th Nongshim Cup was the twelfth edition of the continental team tournament, Nongshim Cup. The cup was won by Team Korea for the tenth time in team history.

Teams

Results

First round

Second round

Final round

See also 
 Information about the preliminaries is at Igo-Kisen.

References 

2011 in go
Nongshim Cup